Queen Seonjeong of the Chungju Yu clan was a Goryeo royal family member as the paternal granddaughter of Prince Sumyeong and maternal granddaughter of King Gwangjong who became a queen consort through her marriage with her maternal first cousin or paternal second cousin, King Mokjong as his first and primary wife. From this marriage, Queen Seonjeong became the sixth reigned Goryeo queen who followed her maternal clan after Queen Mundeok, her mother.

Life
After her biological father's death, her mother remarried again with Seongjong of Goryeo who believed to raised her since young and treated her not different like his own daughters, which made some believed that the future Queen was King Seongjong's real daughter. Although her age was unknown at this time, but seeing that she married Wang Song (grandson of King Gwangjong and Queen Daemok), they must have been at the similar age or slightly older. They were believed to grew up together almost like a sibling, also Mokjong was said to like to follow her as she had taken care of him since childhood.

In 997, King Seongjong died and was succeeded by her husband. She then followed her grandmother, Queen Sinmyeong's clan. Her mother-in-law, Queen Heonae overtook the new King's throne and became a regent since he was not interested in politics.

Based on Goryeosa, it was written that: 
"Mokjong was a King with calm and strong personality, was good at archery and horseback riding, enjoyed alcohol and liked hunting. However, he didn't pay attention to government affairs.”"성품이 침착하고 굳세어 어려서부터 임금의 도량이 있었지만 활쏘기와 말타기를 잘 하고 술을 즐기며 사냥을 좋아하여 정무에 유의하지 않았다"

Also, there were rumors that they two enjoyed sodomy, so it doesn't seem like a good marriage between the couple and they didn't have any children.

Even she can made her husband ascended the throne due to her families' influence and exerted considerable influence in politics in the background of the king's favor, her personal life was not very happy. While Han In-gyeong and others led a Coup d'état to drive out Mokjong and contributed to the upkeep of Hyeonjong, Mokjong learned this and punished the Gim clan's members, but the oppositions to Mokjong were so openly active.

In 1009, Mokjong got dethroned and was assassinated while went to Chungju with his mother. After this, the Queen's life didn't appear in the record, but it was presumed that she was also died along with him in 1009. After her death, she was enshrined in Mokjong's shrine and the couple were buried in the "Uireung tomb" (의릉, 義陵), along with received her Posthumous name.

Based on: 선정왕후

Posthumous name
In March 1014 (5th year reign of King Hyeonjong), name Ui-jeol (의절, 懿節), An-heon (안헌, 安獻) and Jeong-sin (정신, 貞愼) was added.
In October 1056 (10th year reign of King Munjong), name Yang-gyeon (양견, 襄堅) was added.
In October 1253 (40th year reign of King Gojong), name Won-jeong (원정, 元貞) was added to her Posthumous name too.

In popular culture
Portrayed by Lee In-hye and Han Bo-bae in the 2009 KBS2 TV series Empress Cheonchu.

References

External links
Queen Seonjeong on Encykorea .
선정왕후 on Doosan Encyclopedia .

Royal consorts of the Goryeo Dynasty
Korean queens consort
Year of birth unknown
Year of death unknown